The 2020 São Paulo Challenger de Tênis is a professional tennis tournament to be played on clay courts. It is the sixth edition of the tournament which is part of the 2020 ATP Challenger Tour. It takes place in São Paulo, Brazil between 23 and 29 November 2020.

Singles main-draw entrants

Seeds

 1 Rankings as of 16 November 2020.

Other entrants
The following players received wildcards into the singles main draw:
  Gastão Elias
  Igor Marcondes
  João Pedro Sorgi

The following player received entry into the singles main draw as an alternate:
  Aziz Dougaz

The following players received entry from the qualifying draw:
  Alejandro González
  Matheus Pucinelli de Almeida
  João Lucas Reis da Silva
  Camilo Ugo Carabelli

The following player received entry as a lucky loser:
  Benjamin Lock

Champions

Singles

  Felipe Meligeni Alves def.  Frederico Ferreira Silva 6–2, 7–6(7–1).

Doubles

  Luis David Martínez /  Felipe Meligeni Alves def.  Rogério Dutra Silva /  Fernando Romboli 6–3, 6–3.

References

São Paulo Challenger de Tênis
2020
2020 in Brazilian tennis
November 2020 sports events in Brazil